Sovvityazius acer is a species of fish in the family Gobiidae found in the Philippines. This species is the only member of the genus Sovvityazius.

References

Amblyopinae
Monotypic fish genera